M1938 or M-1938 can refer to:
 M1938 mortar, a Soviet infantry mortar
 M1938 howitzer (M-30), a Soviet howitzer
 Labora Fontbernat M-1938, a Spanish submachine gun
 M1938 (rifle), Modello 1938, Italian short rifle